Koščake is a remote settlement in the hills northeast of Begunje in the Municipality of Cerknica in the Inner Carniola region of Slovenia.

References

External links

Koščake on Geopedia

Populated places in the Municipality of Cerknica